Agop Misak Donabidian (born 28 October 1981) is a football coach and former player who is a coach at Lebanese football academy Athletico.

Donabidian was born in Syria to Lebanese parents of Armenian descent; he moved to Lebanon at an early age, and represented their national team at senior level for three years. He played at the 2000 WAFF Championship, 2002 FIFA World Cup qualifiers, and 2004 AFC Asian Cup qualifiers.

Club career 
Donabidian joined Nejmeh on 5 December 2006.

Honours
Homenetmen
 Lebanese Second Division: 2002–03

Nejmeh
 Lebanese Premier League: 2008–09
 Lebanese Super Cup: 2009

Salam Zgharta
 Lebanese FA Cup: 2013–14

Individual
 Lebanese Premier League Best Young Player: 1999–2000

See also
 List of Lebanon international footballers born outside Lebanon

References

External links
 
 
 
 

1981 births
Living people
People from Qamishli
Lebanese people of Armenian descent
Lebanese footballers
Association football defenders
Homenetmen Beirut footballers
FC Vitebsk players
Nejmeh SC players
Salam Zgharta FC players
Lebanese Premier League players
Lebanese Second Division players
Belarusian Premier League players
Lebanon youth international footballers
Lebanon international footballers
Asian Games competitors for Lebanon
Footballers at the 2002 Asian Games
Association football coaches
Lebanese football managers
Lebanese expatriate footballers
Lebanese expatriate sportspeople in Belarus
Expatriate footballers in Belarus